Finnish school shooting or similar terms can refer to:

 The Raumanmeri school shooting of January 1989 
 The Jokela school shooting of November 2007 
 The Kauhajoki school shooting of September 2008